Carterornis is a genus of birds in the family Monarchidae that are found in Australia and Melanesia.

Taxonomy
When the genus Monarcha was split based on the results of a molecular phylogenetic study published in 2005, 3 species were moved to the resurrected genus Carterornis. The genus had originally been introduced by the Australian born ornithologist Gregory Mathews in 1912 with the white-eared monarch (Carterornis leucotis) as the type species.

Species
The genus contains the following species:
 White-eared monarch (Carterornis leucotis)
 White-naped monarch (Carterornis pileatus)
Tanimbar monarch (Carterornis castus)
 Golden monarch (Carterornis chrysomela)

References

 
Monarchidae
Taxa named by Gregory Mathews